Adolf Mussafia (15 February 1835 – 7 June 1905), also known as Adolfo Mussafia or Adolpho Mussaphia, was a polyglot Austrian philologist from Dalmatia, author of over 350 works.

Further reading
T. Elsen, Adolf Mussafia. Zur 100. Wiederkehr seines Todestages, Institut für Romanistik der Universität Wien, 2005

References

Austrian male writers
Romance philologists
Austrian philologists
1835 births
1905 deaths
Writers from Split, Croatia
People from the Kingdom of Dalmatia
Converts to Roman Catholicism from Judaism
Croatian Sephardi Jews
Austro-Hungarian Jews
Members of the House of Lords (Austria)
Recipients of the Pour le Mérite (civil class)
Academic staff of the University of Vienna
Members of the Prussian Academy of Sciences
Members of the Austrian Academy of Sciences